R.P. Inderaprastha Institute of Medical Sciences (RPIIMS) is part of the R.P. Educational Trust, Karnal, Haryana, India, established by Sh. R.P. Singal, a leading and learned industrialist. RPIIT Campus symbolizes the inspiration, desire and dream of its founder for the enhancement of Technological and Management Education required for the overall development of India. RPIIMS is approved by the Indian Nursing Council.

References

Nursing schools in India
Universities and colleges in Haryana

Karnal district